The Friedrichshafen FF.1 was a German experimental floatplane built in 1912. It was the first aircraft designed and built by the newly established Flugzeugbau Friedrichshafen. Only one prototype was constructed and it set a world record for endurance in 1913 before crashing in early 1914.

Development and description
Company founder Theodor Kober had purchased a Curtiss A-2 floatplane to test the hydrodynamic performance of its central float in 1912. Dissatisfied with its performance in rough water, he designed the FF.1 with a float of his own design that he believed would have better performance. It first flew on 2 November although towed testing of various float shapes continued into January 1913.

The aircraft was a two-seat biplane with a  Argus As I straight-four engine in pusher configuration mounted at the rear of the fuselage. The engine's radiators were mounted on the sides of the fuselage. The ailerons were fitted between the wings. A pair of wheels could be attached to the airplane to allow it to maneuver on the ground.

History
During one flight in bad weather, the engine failed and the FF.1 was forced to land in Lake Constance. Despite high waves and a heavy snowfall, the aircraft drifted for 2 1/2 hours before it was recovered without needing repairs to the airframe or floats. Piloted by the company's test pilot, Robert Gsell, on 14 February 1913, the FF.1 set a world flight endurance record of 2 hours, 32 minutes, and 30 seconds. The floatplane was destroyed in a crash in February 1914.

Specifications (variant specified)

References

Bibliography

Friedrichshafen aircraft
Floatplanes